Keya Akter Payel better known as Keya Payel is a Bangladeshi television actress, movie actress and model. She is mostly popular for her works in Bangladeshi dramas. She has worked in a movie Indubala as a lead actress. The movie was released in theatre in 2019.

Payel was born in Ashulia, Savar Upazila, Dhaka District. She attended Uttara Cambrian School and College, and as of November 2020 was studying law at Southeast University.

Filmography

Dramas

Films
 Indubala (2019)

Music videos
 Valobashi Tai - Tahsan Khan
 Keno Eto Chai Toke - Imran Mahmudul & Fairooj Labiba
 Alo - Imran Mahmudul & Poni Chakma
 Eto Valobashi - Imran Mahmudul
 Dari Koma - Shiekh Sadi
 Poran Bondhure - Imran Mahmudul

References

Bangladeshi actresses
Bangladeshi film actresses
Living people
Year of birth missing (living people)